A resistant reading is a reading of a text which moves beyond the dominant cultural beliefs to challenge prevailing views. It means to read a text as it was not meant to be read; in fact reading the text against itself.

Textual example
By way of illustration, consider Andrew Marvell's poem To His Coy Mistress.

A resistant reading may develop from an alternative reading, pointing out how the representation of gender in the poem furthers the notion of gender as binary oppositions, the male is active and powerful, the female is passive and marginalized. As such, it will be read by readers who share feminist views of the world as a place structured by gender inequality and discrimination against women. For example, Marvell's representation of heterosexuality in the poem may be read as being exploitative, based as it is on the persona psychologically terrorizing the woman. Marvell depicts his persona as attempting to have the woman submit as a result of the fear he seeks to instill within her; Marvell's vivid and confronting imagery is most significant and not accidental:

Nor, in thy marble Vault, shall sound
My ecchoing Song: then Worms shall try
That long preserv'd Virginity:...

Historical Approaches

Theories of resistant reading have been identified in a number of historic approaches to the question of interpretation. Michel de Certeau describes reading as wayward act that refuses to follow the prescriptive protocols of others. Readers 'move across lands belonging to someone else,' writes de Certeau, 'like nomads poaching their way across fields they did not write, despoiling the wealth of Egypt to enjoy it themselves'. Roger Chartier has argued that reading is something that 'only rarely leaves traces, that is scattered in an infinity of singular acts, and that easily shakes off all constraints.' A number of historians of reading have elaborated on the idea to interpret readers of the past. Bill Bell, for example, has discovered a range of resistant hermeneutic strategies across nineteenth-century communities, from emigrants and convicts to polar explorers and troops in the First World War.

Importance
Resistant reading is an element of some current critical and interpretive repertoire. It is worth considering whether diegetic border crossing always strengthens the potential for resistant reading (as might seem intuitively likely, given that readers are moving in and out of the story), or whether on some occasions it might trigger the reverse effect.

See also
 Judith Fetterley
 The Resisting Reader (1977), by Judith Fetterley
 Robert Belton, Sights of Resistance:  Approaches to Canadian Visual Culture (Calgary: University of Calgary Press, 2001).
Postcritique

References

Literary criticism